Camp Ellsworth is a former American Civil War training camp that existed in 1862 in North Cambridge, Massachusetts. It was located near Fresh Pond, at the abandoned Reed and Bartlett Icehouse. It was first occupied by the 1st Regiment Massachusetts Volunteer Infantry on June 1, 1861.

See also
 List of military installations in Massachusetts

References

1861 establishments in Massachusetts
Buildings and structures in Cambridge, Massachusetts
Military facilities in Massachusetts
Military installations established in 1861